Phillip Epps (born November 11, 1959) is a former American football wide receiver for the Green Bay Packers (1982-1988) and the New York Jets (1989). He attended Texas Christian University.

One of his more memorable catches was a 1985 game against the Minnesota Vikings in which he caught a pass from Lynn Dickey on the 21-yard line. His momentum from contact with a Vikings defender caused him to nearly fall out of bounds, but he successfully hopped on one foot along the sidelines for the remaining 21 yards for a touchdown.  The Packers won 27-17.

Epps was also a World-Class sprinter. His personal best of  20.19 seconds in the 200 meters was the second fastest time in the world in 1982. He also competed in the 55 meters and 100 meters, posting personal bests of 6.08 seconds and 10.16 seconds.

References

1958 births
Living people
People from Atlanta, Texas
American football wide receivers
American football return specialists
TCU Horned Frogs football players
Green Bay Packers players
New York Jets players